Faafu may refer to:

Faafu Atoll, an administrative division of the Maldives.
Faafu, the 11th consonant of the Thaana abugaida used in Dhivehi.